A gore is a sector of a curved surface  or the curved surface that lies between two close lines of longitude on a globe and may be flattened to a plane surface with little distortion.  The term has been extended to include similarly shaped pieces such as the panels of a hot-air balloon or parachute,  or the triangular insert that allows extra movement in a garment (see Gore (fabrics)).

Examples 

 

 Globes of the Earth and the celestial sphere were first mass-produced by Johannes Schöner using a process of printing map details on 12 paper gores that were cut out then pasted to a sphere. This process is still often used. The gores are conveniently made to each have a width of 30 degrees of longitude matching the principal meridians from the South Pole and North Pole to the Equator. 
 Parachutes and hot air balloons are made from gores of lightweight material. The gores are cut from flat material and stitched together to create various shapes. 
 Pressure suit joints are often constructed of alternating gores and convolutes of material constrained by cables or straps along the sides of the joint, producing an accordion-like structure that flexes with nearly constant volume to minimize the mechanical work which must be done by the suit occupant.
 Corners in round duct-work can be created by welding or fixing gores of metal sheet to form a bend.  
 Some designers use the stretched grid method to design gores that are cut out of weather-resistant fabric and then stitched together to form fabric structures.

References 

Cartography
Complex surfaces
Geometric shapes